Scholastica is a web-based software platform for managing academic journals with integrated peer review and open access publishing tools.

History
Scholastica was founded in 2012 by Brian Cody, Rob Walsh, and Cory Schires, who met while they were graduate students at the University of Chicago. In May 2014, Scholastica acquired $510,000 in seed funding from investors.

Product
Scholastica offers two main products: Peer review software and Open Access publishing software. Scholastica customers include journals in the humanities, social sciences, and STEM, as well as student-run law reviews.

Academic publishing
In March 2016 Discrete Analysis, an arXiv overlay journal launched by Fields Medalist Sir Timothy Gowers, started using Scholastica for both Peer review and Open Access publishing.

Open access
Scholastica is a supporter of the open access movement. Scholastica has worked with open access advocates like Björn Brembs, Stevan Harnad and others to create open access resources for the academic community.

Scholastica has been referenced by scholars including, Mark C. Wilson, as a software and service-based open access publishing option that could lower publishing costs by “at least 75% of current payments”

Typesetting service
In February 2018, Scholastica launched a new typesetting service for open access journals that uses technology to generate HTML and PDF articles from DOCX files.

References

Further reading
 

Open access publishers
Internet properties established in 2012
2012 establishments in Illinois
Companies based in Chicago